Lourdes Gutiérrez Nájera is an American cultural anthropologist. She is a tenured Associate Professor at Fairhaven College of Interdisciplinary Studies teaching in the American Cultural Studies curriculum. Her prior experience includes her work as assistant professor in the Department of Anthropology at both Dartmouth College and Drake University. She is a member of the Latin American Studies Association, American Anthropological Association, and Mujeres Activas en Letras y Cambio Social. Her research is published in journals and books such as Beyond El Barrio: Everyday Life in Latina/o America. Other publications include reviews of scholarly work. Her academic accomplishments and research pertain to the field of Latinx national migration, indigenous communities in the United States and Mexico, and the U.S.-Mexican borderlands.

Early life
Gutiérrez Nájera received her bachelor's degree in Latin American Studies at the University of California, Los Angeles after transferring with an associate degree from Pasadena City College. In 2007 she published an award-winning dissertation and received a joint Ph.D. in Social Work and Anthropology at the University of Michigan, Ann Arbor. She holds a professional degree in Social Work with a concentration in Health Policy and Evaluation from University of Michigan.

Recognition
Gutiérrez Nájera was awarded first place for her dissertation "Yalálag is No Longer Just Yalálag: Circulating Conflict and Contesting Community in a Zapotec Transnational Circuit" at the American Association of Hispanics in Higher Education 2009 conference.

Research
Much of Gutiérrez Nájera's ethnographic research and work is within the frameworks of transnational migration and indigeneity. Gutiérrez Nájera's focus is on concepts of identity, conflict and belonging.

Hayandose
In her work, "Hayandose: Zapotec Migrant Expressions of Membership and Belonging," Gutierrez Najera conducted ethnographic research in the Los Angeles enclave of migrants from the Zapotec town of Yalálag, Oaxaca.  Hayandose refers to the phrase "no se hayaban." The Yalaltecos use this phrase to explain a feeling of displacement, or of "belonging neither here nor there." Gutierrez Najera developed the concept of hayandose to explain cultural practices that create a sense of belonging, collective identity and community:

"As Yalaltecos, part of the Oaxacalifornia experience, inhabiting a space that is neither fully Yalálag or Angelinos, reflects the ambiguities they feel about belonging neither here nor there. But through participation in cultural events and practices such as those described in this chapter, Yalaltecos living in Los Angeles create a sense of belonging."

Gutiérrez Nájera contends that the Yalaltec community displays the feeling of belonging, creation of space and community for transnational migrants in which migrants symbolically exist and participate in multiple sites. Other scholars who have contributed in the area of indigenous transnational migration include [Lynn Stephen], Jonathan Fox, Gaspar Rivera-Salgado and Robert C. Smith.

Conflict and migration
Instead of viewing conflict as a finite event, Gutiérrez Nájera describes it as a process. Using a historical framework, she argues migration and the state play a role in the production of conflict among Yalaltecans. She expanded on this in her essay "Transnational Migration, Conflict, and Divergent Ideologies of Progress". In this piece, she argues conflict and migration are "interrelated parts of broad historical, economic, and political processes" that unfold through the "circulation of people, ideas, and goods". This understanding of transnational migration as part of the process of local conflict offers a new perspective for social workers working with indigenous migrants.

Child welfare
Her work Latinos and Child Welfare influenced the literature and practices of social workers working with children in the Latino community. Gutiérrez Nájera helped identify the unique social service needs and characteristics of this population and has been cited by other scholars to help address these issues.

Publications
 Comparative Indigeneities of the Américas: Toward a Hemispheric Approach. Co-edited Anthology with M. Bianet Castellanos  and Arturo Aldama. University of Arizona Press, Critical Issues in Indigenous Studies Series.
“Zapotec Death and Mourning across Transnational Frontiers.” In Transnational Death. Eerika Koskinen-Koivisto, Samira Saramo, and Hanna Snellman (Eds). Finland: Studia Fennica. 2019. 
 “Transnational Settler Colonial Formations and Global Capital: A consideration of Indigenous Transnational Migrants.” Co-authored with Korinta Maldonado. Forum on Settler Colonialism in Latin America. American Quarterly. 2017 69(4): 809-821. 
“Racemaking in New Orleans: Racial Boundary Construction and Prospects for Social Change.” Co-authored with Natalie Alice Young. Identities: Global Studies in Culture and Power.  2017(24)(3): 332-350, DOI: 10.1080/1070289X.2016.1148606
“From transnationalism to the 1.5 generation: Shifting theoretical frames and changing (im)migration contexts.” Special Issue on Immigration from the United States and Mexico. In, Practicing Anthropology 2016 (38)(1): 45-6.
“Paradox of Performing Exceptionalism: Complicating the Deserving/Undeserving Binary of Undocumented Immigrant Youth.” Co-authored with Claudia Anguiano. Association of Mexican American Educators (AMAE) Journal. December 2015 (9)(2): 45-56.
“Beyond National Origins: Latin@ American Indigenous Migration.” In “Vital Topics Forum on Latin@s and the Immigration Debate.” American Anthropologist 2014 (116)(1):8-9.
“Transnational Migration, Conflict and Divergent Ideologies of Progress.” Urban Anthropology and Studies of Cultural Systems and World Economic Development 2009 (38)(2-4): 1-34. 
"Hayandose: Zapotec Migrant Expressions of Membership and Belonging. Chapter in Beyond El Barrio: Everyday Life in Latina/o América, Adrian Burgos Jr., Frank Guridy, and Gina Perez (Eds.). New York: New York University Press. pp. 63–80. 
“Reconstructing Zapotec Transnational Identities and Localities in a Virtual Environment.” In Indigenous Peoples in Urban Centers: Tracing Mobility in a Post NAFTA World, M. Bianet Castellanos and Ivonne Vizcarra Bordi (eds.). Proceedings, Cahiers Dialog, Cahier No. 2012-02: 9-13. Montréal, Canada.
 Oaxaca's Social Problem from a Yalalteco Perspective. Anthropology News. 48(5):64.
 Talking About Race. In Strategies for Teaching Anthropology, Patricia Rice (ed.). New Jersey: Pearson Prentice Hall. pp. 28–34.
 Changes in Empowerment: Effects of Participation in a Lay Health Promotion Program. With Victoria K. Booker, June Grube Robinson, and Bonnie J. Kay. Health Education Quarterly 24(4): 452-464.
 Latinos and Child Welfare/Los Latinos y el Bienestar del Niño: Voces de la Comunidad, with R. Ortega and C. Guillean, 1996.

References

Further reading
 Fox, Jonathan, and Gaspar Rivera-Salgado. "Indigenous Mexican Migrants in the United States." La Jolla, CA: Center for U.S.-Mexican Studies, Center for Comparative Immigration Studies, University of California, San Diego, 2004.
 Smith, Robert C. "Mexican New York: Transnational Lives of New Immigrants." Berkeley: University of California, 2006.
 Stephen, Lynn. "Transborder Lives: Oaxacan Indigenous Migrants in the U.S. and Mexico." Durham: Duke University Press, 2007.

Year of birth missing (living people)
Living people
American women essayists
Anthropology educators
Cultural anthropologists
Drake University faculty
Hispanic and Latino American teachers
Latin Americanists
University of California, Los Angeles alumni
University of Michigan School of Social Work alumni
American women anthropologists
American women academics
21st-century American women